ComcastTIX is a regional consumer ticketing company powered by New Era Tickets.  Comcast Spectacor, the Philadelphia-based sports and entertainment firm, in a partnership with Comcast Cable, launched ComcastTIX on September 12, 2006.  ComcastTIX is a provider of customized ticketing and fan marketing to sports and entertainment organizations.

ComcastTIX provides clients with the power to set all consumer fees, control all selling options to the consumer, and collect and use customer data for targeted marketing and sales communications.  Services included by ComcastTIX consist of a 24/7 call center, order fulfillment (including express mail option), marketing communications, retail outlets, customer service, technical support, and ticketing system training.

In addition to purchasing tickets on the website, consumers can also buy tickets over the phone or at select Acme Markets.  Tickets are available at designated Arenas box offices through ComcastTIX as well.  ComcastTIX informs customers of upcoming events to keep them up to date and to retain their loyalty.  Consumers can purchase tickets for sporting events, concerts, comedy shows, and more for events at a variety of venues throughout select parts of the country.

ComcastTIX primarily serves the Philadelphia, South Jersey, Delaware, and Maryland region.

Clients 
East
Appel Farm Festival - Elmer, New Jersey
Borgata Casino - Atlantic City, New Jersey
Dover International Speedway - Dover, Delaware
Excelon Golf Invitational - Philadelphia, Pennsylvania
Helium Comedy Club - Philadelphia, Pennsylvania
Liacouras Center - Philadelphia, Pennsylvania
New Jersey Motorsports Park - Millville, New Jersey
Penn Relays - Philadelphia, Pennsylvania
Pocono Raceway - Long Pond, Pennsylvania
Society Hill Playhouse - Philadelphia, Pennsylvania
Sun National Bank Center - Trenton, New Jersey
Trenton Devils
Wachovia Center - Philadelphia, Pennsylvania
Philadelphia 76ers
Philadelphia Flyers
Philadelphia Soul
Philadelphia Wings
World Team Tennis - King of Prussia, Pennsylvania

Central
Budweiser Events Center - Loveland, Colorado
Colorado Eagles Hockey - Loveland, Colorado
Richard M. Borchard Regional Fairgrounds - Robstown, Texas

West
Portland Trail Blazers - Portland, Oregon
Portland Trail Blazers Premium Seating - Portland, Oregon
Rose Quarter - Portland, Oregon

References 
ABC - Comcast Launches Ticket Agency
New Ticketing Company

External links
ComcastTIX
New Era Tickets

Companies based in Chester County, Pennsylvania
Comcast subsidiaries
American companies established in 2006
2006 establishments in Pennsylvania